"Death Valley '69" is a song by American alternative rock band Sonic Youth and featuring Lydia Lunch. The song was written and sung by Thurston Moore and fellow New York musician Lunch, and recorded by Martin Bisi in 1984. A demo version of the song was released in December 1984 on Iridescence Records. A re-recorded version was released in EP format with different artwork in June 1985; this version was featured on their second studio album, Bad Moon Rising.

Music video 

The video for "Death Valley '69" was filmed in 1985 and was the first music video by Sonic Youth, directed by Judith Barry and Richard Kern. The video features the majority of the band in various states of bloody dismemberment interlaced with live footage of the band. It also stars alternative model Lung Leg. The video is the only one to feature both recently departed drummer Bob Bert and new member Steve Shelley.

Critical reception 
The song was ranked number 10 among the "Tracks of the Year" for 1985 by NME.

Cover versions 
Soundgarden included a sample of the song on the track Smokestack Lightning from the band's Ultramega OK album in 1988.

Track listing 

 1984 version

 "Death Valley '69" – 5:32
 "Brave Men Run (In My Family)" – 3:48

 1985 version

 "Death Valley '69"
 "I Dream I Dreamed"
 "Inhuman"
 "Brother James"
 "Satan Is Boring"

Personnel 
 Sonic Youth

 Thurston Moore – guitar, lead vocals, production
 Kim Gordon – bass guitar, production, backing vocals
 Lee Ranaldo – guitar, backing vocals, production
 Bob Bert – drums, production

 Additional personnel

 Lydia Lunch – lead vocals, production

 Technical

 Martin Bisi – engineering, production
 John Erskine – engineering, production
 Clint Ruin – engineering, production

References 

Sonic Youth songs
1984 debut singles
1984 songs
1985 EPs
Music videos directed by Richard Kern